Charles Watts (1870–1924) was an English footballer who played in the Football League for Blackburn Rovers, Burton Wanderers and Newcastle United.

References

1870 births
1924 deaths
English footballers
Association football goalkeepers
English Football League players
Middlesbrough Ironopolis F.C. players
Blackburn Rovers F.C. players
Burton Wanderers F.C. players
Newcastle United F.C. players
Footballers from Stockton-on-Tees
Footballers from County Durham